Adam and Eve is a 1969 Soviet comedy film directed by Alexey Korenev.

Plot 
According to Sharia law, a husband who has divorced his wife can return her only if her next husband divorces her. Undertaker Bekir wants to get his wife back and so he marries her to a hairdresser named Adam.

Cast 
 Frunzik Mkrtchyan
 Yekaterina Vasilyeva
 Gogi Gegechkori
 Yevgeny Lebedev
 Lyubov Dobrzhanskaya
 Anastasia Voznesenskaya
 Bariat Muradova
 Ramaz Giorgobiani		
 Ivan Kuznetsov
 Yefim Kopelyan

References

External links 
 

1969 films
1960s Russian-language films
Soviet drama films
1969 drama films